The Europe Zone was one of the two regional zones of the 1923 International Lawn Tennis Challenge.

For the first time, the competition would be split into two zones: the America Zone and the Europe Zone. This change was necessitated by having more than 16 teams compete for the cup (thus not fitting into one easily workable draw). The past several years had also seen a rise in the number of defaults, as teams from around the globe tried to work out the logistics of playing such an international tournament. Regional zones would help alleviate these problems.

13 teams entered the Europe Zone, with the winner going on to compete in the Inter-Zonal Final against the winner of the America Zone. France defeated Spain in the final, and went on to face Australia in the Inter-Zonal Final.

Draw

First round

Belgium vs. Great Britain

France vs. Denmark

Ireland vs. India

Switzerland vs. Czechoslovakia

Quarterfinals

Netherlands vs. Italy

Great Britain vs. Spain

Ireland vs. France

Switzerland vs. Argentina

Semifinals

Spain vs. Netherlands

France vs. Switzerland

Final

France vs. Spain

References

External links
Davis Cup official website

Davis Cup Europe/Africa Zone
Europe Zone
International Lawn Tennis Challenge